Theresa Station is an unincorporated community located in the town of Theresa, Dodge County, Wisconsin, United States. The area was located at a railroad depot for the Minneapolis, St. Paul and Sault Ste. Marie Railroad, commonly known as the Soo Line. The area once featured "two feed mills and a lumberyard." The depot has since been torn down.

References

External links
 A Soo Line freight train passing Theresa Station in 1978

Unincorporated communities in Dodge County, Wisconsin
Unincorporated communities in Wisconsin
Former Soo Line stations